Liu Zhengwei (February 1930 – July 9, 2012) was a Chinese politician, best known for his term as Communist Party Secretary of Guizhou province.

Liu was born in Xinzheng County, Henan. He attended Kaifeng High School. He worked for Second Mechanic Works. In 1980, he became the party chief of Nanyang, Henan. Then he was promoted to deputy provincial party chief of Henan. In 1987, he was named deputy party chief of Guizhou; the next year, he became party chief of Guizhou, succeeding Hu Jintao. He was also Chairman of the Guizhou People's Congress. In 1993, he became the deputy secretary of the Working Committee of State Organs.

Liu was a member of the 12th, 13th, and 14th Central Committees of the Chinese Communist Party.

He died on July 9, 2012, at the age of 82.

Liu's wife, Yan Jianhong, also a government official, was executed on January 16, 1995, after being convicted of bribery and embezzlement.

References

Chinese Communist Party politicians from Henan
1930 births
2012 deaths
Members of the 13th Central Committee of the Chinese Communist Party
Members of the 12th Central Committee of the Chinese Communist Party
Members of the 14th Central Committee of the Chinese Communist Party